The women's team sepak takraw competition at the 2014 Asian Games in Incheon was held from 23 September to 28 September at the Bucheon Gymnasium.

Squads

Results 
All times are Korea Standard Time (UTC+09:00)

Preliminary

Group A

|-
|rowspan=2|23 September||rowspan=2|14:30
|rowspan=2 align=right|
|rowspan=2 align=center|1–2
|rowspan=2 align=left|
|colspan=3|0–2||colspan=3|0–2||colspan=3|2–0
|-
|19–21||19–21|| ||19–21||17–21|| ||22–20||21–16||
|-
|rowspan=2|24 September||rowspan=2|14:30
|rowspan=2 align=right|
|rowspan=2 align=center|1–2
|rowspan=2 align=left|
|colspan=3|0–2||colspan=3|0–2||colspan=3|2–0
|-
|11–21||14–21|| ||9–21||13–21|| ||21–12||21–15||
|-
|rowspan=2|25 September||rowspan=2|14:30
|rowspan=2 align=right|
|rowspan=2 align=center|0–3
|rowspan=2 align=left|
|colspan=3|1–2||colspan=3|0–2||colspan=3|0–2
|-
|21–6||13–21||12–21||7–21||9–21|| ||13–21||15–21||

Group B

|-
|rowspan=2|23 September||rowspan=2|14:30
|rowspan=2 align=right|
|rowspan=2 align=center|3–0
|rowspan=2 align=left|
|colspan=3|2–1||colspan=3|2–0||colspan=3|2–0
|-
|20–22||21–19||21–11||21–4||21–3|| ||21–8||21–11||
|-
|rowspan=2|23 September||rowspan=2|14:30
|rowspan=2 align=right|
|rowspan=2 align=center|3–0
|rowspan=2 align=left|
|colspan=3|2–0||colspan=3|2–1||colspan=3|2–0
|-
|21–9||21–15|| ||24–22||18–21||21–12||21–2||21–4||
|-
|rowspan=2|24 September||rowspan=2|14:30
|rowspan=2 align=right|
|rowspan=2 align=center|3–0
|rowspan=2 align=left|
|colspan=3|2–0||colspan=3|2–0||colspan=3|2–0
|-
|21–7||21–7|| ||21–4||21–14|| ||21–6||21–6||
|-
|rowspan=2|24 September||rowspan=2|14:30
|rowspan=2 align=right|
|rowspan=2 align=center|2–1
|rowspan=2 align=left|
|colspan=3|0–2||colspan=3|2–1||colspan=3|2–0
|-
|20–22||16–21|| ||21–13||17–21||21–18||21–15||21–11||
|-
|rowspan=2|25 September||rowspan=2|14:30
|rowspan=2 align=right|
|rowspan=2 align=center|0–3
|rowspan=2 align=left|
|colspan=3|0–2||colspan=3|0–2||colspan=3|0–2
|-
|8–21||16–21|| ||18–21||16–21|| ||13–21||7–21||
|-
|rowspan=2|25 September||rowspan=2|14:30
|rowspan=2 align=right|
|rowspan=2 align=center|3–0
|rowspan=2 align=left|
|colspan=3|2–0||colspan=3|2–0||colspan=3|2–0
|-
|21–13||21–17|| ||21–7||21–10|| ||21–14||21–11||

Knockout round

Semifinals

|-
|rowspan=2|27 September||rowspan=2|09:00
|rowspan=2 align=right|
|rowspan=2 align=center|1–2
|rowspan=2 align=left|
|colspan=3|2–0||colspan=3|1–2||colspan=3|1–2
|-
|21–19||21–18|| ||21–13||15–21||12–21||11–21||21–19||14–21
|-
|rowspan=2|27 September||rowspan=2|14:30
|rowspan=2 align=right|
|rowspan=2 align=center|2–0
|rowspan=2 align=left|
|colspan=3|2–1||colspan=3|2–0||colspan=3|
|-
|21–15||19–21||21–6||21–14||21–8|| || || ||

Gold medal match

|-
|rowspan=2|28 September||rowspan=2|09:30
|rowspan=2 align=right|
|rowspan=2 align=center|0–2
|rowspan=2 align=left|
|colspan=3|1–2||colspan=3|0–2||colspan=3|
|-
|11–21||21–11||16–21||9–21||13–21|| || || ||

References 

 Results

External links
 Official website

Sepak takraw at the 2014 Asian Games